Brackenridge Works is a specialty steel mill facility owned by Allegheny Technologies and operated by its Flat-Rolled Products segment in the Pittsburgh suburbs of Natrona, Pennsylvania.

References

External links
ATI Flat Rolled Products - Operations

Buildings and structures in Allegheny County, Pennsylvania
[Category:Industrial buildings and structures in Pennsylvania]]
Ironworks and steel mills in Pennsylvania